Pakistaniaat: A Journal of Pakistan Studies is a peer-reviewed open access academic journal established in 2009, which covers research on Pakistan studies. It is published triannually by the English Department of the University of North Texas and is also sponsored by the American Institute of Pakistan Studies. Pakistaniaat occasionally publishes special issues, for example on the Indo-Pakistani War of 1971.

Abstracting and indexing 
A member of The Council of Editors of Learned Journals, Pakistaniaat is indexed in LivRe!, the MLA International Bibliography, and Ulrich's Periodicals Directory.

References

External links 
 

South Asian studies journals
Triannual journals
English-language journals
Publications established in 2009
University of North Texas
Pakistan studies
Creative Commons-licensed journals
Works about Pakistan
Academic journals published by universities and colleges